Geographical Indications in Tunisia are a form of intellectual property available for  "natural or processed agricultural and food products". Geographical indications can be registered based on the Law No. 99-57 of June 28, 1999, on Controlled Appellations of Origin and Indications of Source of Agricultural Products Registrations is possible as a Appellation of Origin (Appellation d'origine contrôlée, AOC) or as an Indication of Source (Indication de Provenance, IP). 

Tunisia is a party to the Lisbon Agreement, but not to its Geneva protocol and thus a large number of foreign Geographical indications is protected in Tunisia, while 7 Tunisian Geographical indications is protected in other Lisbon Agreement parties.

Registered Geographical Indications
As of August 2021, 14 products are protected through Geographical Indications, 7 of which are also protected in the member states of the Lisbon Agreements. Most of them are Tunisian wines. The list of Tunisian GIs is shown below:

Protection of foreign geographical indications
Tunisia is a party to the Lisbon Agreement for the Protection of Appellations of Origin and their International Registration since 1973. Under the agreement states an submit geographical indications for protection in all member states. Protection is granted, unless a member state objects within 1 year. As Tunisia has not objected to any of the geographical indications, all 933 (as of September 2021) geographical indications registered over 1 year ago are protected in Tunisia.

References

Geographical indications